The Ohio Company Land Office is one of the original buildings of the city of Marietta, Ohio, United States.  The Office is listed individually in the National Register of Historic Places and as a contributing property to the Marietta Historic District.
The Land Office was built after Ohio Company of Associates landed at Marietta in 1788. In 1791 the building was moved away from the Muskingum River so it could be protected by the guns of Campus Martius. The building is a simple log structure with a gabled roof, pierced by a single chimney; one window is set into the side, and the front has space for just one window and the main entrance. Its location on a slope permits the slight exposure of the foundation on one side. Smaller elements include shutters for the windows and a pair of steps that provide access to the main entrance. As the oldest extant building anywhere in Ohio, the land office had become the focus of significant attention by the opening years of the twentieth century, with organizations such as Marietta's historical society devoting extensive effort to ensure its preservation.

The building is now part of the Campus Martius Museum complex.

References

External links

Commercial buildings completed in 1788
Houses on the National Register of Historic Places in Ohio
National Register of Historic Places in Washington County, Ohio
Buildings and structures in Marietta, Ohio
Northwest Territory
1788 establishments in the Northwest Territory
Houses in Washington County, Ohio
Individually listed contributing properties to historic districts on the National Register in Ohio
Office buildings completed in 1788